The Allin House is a historic house located at 515 Columbia Street in Helena-West Helena, Arkansas.

Description and history 
It is a two-story brick structure, with a hip roof topped by a flat section once surrounded by either iron or wooden railings. The main facade has a two-story porch, supported by six simple wooden posts, with an ornate entablature and paired brackets in the cornice above the posts. The main roof line also has paired brackets. The house was probably built in the 1850s, and is noted for its transitional Italianate-Queen Anne styling. It is also notable as the home from 1868 to his death in 1881 of Henderson Robinson, an African-American who served in a variety of county offices during the Reconstruction Era after the American Civil War.

The house was listed on the National Register of Historic Places on June 4, 1973.

See also
National Register of Historic Places listings in Phillips County, Arkansas

References

Houses on the National Register of Historic Places in Arkansas
Houses completed in 1856
Houses in Phillips County, Arkansas
National Register of Historic Places in Phillips County, Arkansas